Victims of Vice is a 1978 French film directed by Jacques Scandelari based on Michel Brice's novel edited by Gérard de Villiers.

Cast
 Patrice Valota: inspector Boris Corentin
 Odile Michel: Micheline
 Florence Cayrol: Annie
 Marie-Georges Pascal: Peggy
 Patrick Olivier: Patrick Morel
 Jacques Berthier: Paul-Henri Vaugoubert de Saint-Loup
 Marianne Comtell: Nada
 Jacques Dacqmine: chief  of police
 Jean-Pol Brissart: inspector Brichot
 Gisèle Grimm: Mrs. Pandolini
 Hélène Hily: mother of the victim
 Philippe Castelli: headwaiter

References

External links
 
 Victims of Vice at Encyclo-ciné (French)

1978 films
French crime drama films
1970s French-language films
1978 crime films
Films about prostitution in France
Films about drugs
Films based on French novels
1970s French films